"Peace Be Still" is a song performed by American contemporary Christian singer Hope Darst. The song was released on February 7, 2020, as the lead single from her debut studio album, Peace Be Still (2020). Darst co-wrote the song with Andrew Holt and Mia Fieldes. Jonathan Smith produced the single.

"Peace Be Still" peaked at No. 6 on the US Hot Christian Songs chart. "Peace Be Still" received a nomination for the GMA Dove Award Worship Recorded Song of the Year at the 2021 GMA Dove Awards.

Background
On February 7, 2020, Darst released "Peace Be Still" as her debut single via Fair Trade Services with her debut album slated for release in summer 2020. The song had been originally performed by The Belonging Co and Lauren Daigle, released on The Belonging Co's debut album, All the Earth (2017). On January 10, 2020, Fair Trade Services announced that "Peace Be Still" will be serviced to Christian radio in the United States, the official add date for the single slated on February 28, 2020. Darst shared the story behind the song, saying:

Composition

Reception

Critical response
Jonathan Andre of 365 Days of Inspiring Media gave a positive review of the song, saying "Writing and singing about peace when the world they knew was upside down is quite a wacky concept. But as evident in the song and how strong it is lyrically and musically in my opinion, “Peace Be Still” is a winner!"

Accolades

Music videos
The official lyric video of "Peace Be Still" was published on Hope Darst's YouTube channel on February 7, 2020. The official audio video of the song showcasing the single's artwork was published on YouTube on February 24, 2020. The official performance video for the "Peace Be Still" was availed by Hope Darst on August 16, 2020, to YouTube.

Track listing

Charts

Weekly charts

Year-end charts

Release history

References

External links
 

2020 songs
2020 singles
Contemporary Christian songs